The Northern Silk Road is an ancient trackway in northern China originating in the early capital of Xi'an and extending north of the Taklamakan Desert to reach the ancient kingdoms of Parthia, Bactria and eventually Persia and Rome.  It is the northernmost branch of several Silk Roads providing trade, military movements and cultural exchange between China and the west.  The use of this route was expanded pursuant to actions by the Han dynasty in the latter part of the first millennium BC to push back northern tribes and control the safe passage of Chinese troops and merchants.

Route
The route started at Chang'an (today's Xi'an), the capital of the Tang dynasty, which, in the Eastern Han, was moved further east to Luoyang. 

The route travels northwest through the Chinese province of Gansu from Shaanxi Province, and splits into three further routes, two of them following the mountain ranges to the north and south of the Taklimakan Desert to rejoin at Kashgar; and the other going north of the Tian Shan mountains through Turpan, Talgar and Almaty (in what is now southeast Kazakhstan).

The routes split west of Kashgar with one branch heading down the Alay Valley towards Termez and Balkh, while the other traveled through Kokand in the Fergana Valley, and then west across the Karakum Desert towards Merv, joining the southern route briefly.

One of the branch routes turned northwest to the north of the Aral and Caspian seas and                                                                           then on to the Black Sea.

See also
Hexi Corridor
Kashgar
Dunhuang

References

External links
 Pictures from the Northern Silk Road

History of transport in China
Sites along the Silk Road